The Living Arts & Science Center, formerly the George B. (Blackburn) Kinkead House, is an art and education center housed in an historic mansion in Lexington, Kentucky. The building is listed on the National Register of Historic Places. It was donated to the center by the Kinkead family in 1981.

The original two-story antebellum mansion is believed to have been designed by Major Thomas Lewinski, a British-born architect, engineer and teacher of foreign languages. It is a Greek revival style building, which was sympathetically enlarged during the Civil War period, with Italianate features. The dwelling was further enlarged , with the construction of a third story attic.

See also
National Register of Historic Places listings in Fayette County, Kentucky

References

External links
Living Arts & Science Center website

National Register of Historic Places in Lexington, Kentucky
Greek Revival architecture in Kentucky
Italianate architecture in Kentucky
Queen Anne architecture in Kentucky
Houses completed in 1846
1846 establishments in Kentucky
Museums in Lexington, Kentucky
Houses in Lexington, Kentucky
Historic house museums in Kentucky
Science museums in Kentucky